The fifteenth series of The Bill, a British television drama, consisted of 87 episodes, broadcast between 7 January and 31 December 1999. The series saw a notable change as female officers were no longer introduced by the W acronym in ranking, with the last mention of this when Liz Rawton was introduced as a WDC in Follow Through. By the following episode, Walking on Water, female characters were simply introduced as PC/DC etc. On 5 June 2013, The Bill Series 15 Part 1 & 2 and The Bill Series 15 Part 3 & 4 DVD sets were released (in Australia).

The series was primarily dominated by individual, stand-alone episodes, but serialised plots were also included after being introduced by Richard Handford when he arrived in the previous series; while some of those were multi-part plots that ran over 2-4 episodes, the serialised element of series 15 saw some plots last a majority of the year. They included a brutal stabbing attack on PC Dave Quinnan in the spring, which led to the introduction of Nurse Jenny Delaney, whose love triangle with Quinnan and PC George Garfield led to the exit of Garfield after Huw Higginson's 10-year stint in the role; Quinnan's stabbing was also re-visited almost a year after his stabbing in series 16. Also carrying into the following year was the arrest of PC Eddie Santini, which in turn was a continuation of his plot involving actor Michael Higgs' off-screen partner Caroline Catz from the previous year, PC Rosie Fox returning as a DS several months after being bullied out of Sun Hill following a campaign by Santini; this plot ended in the spring but was revisited a year later for Santini's trial.

However, the most notable long-term plot saw DC Jim Carver moved back to uniform as a PC due to the real-life Metropolitan Police's controversial tenure system, which moved officers out of CID after ten years if they weren't considered for promotion or a transfer. Actor Mark Wingett revealed in 2018 during an interview on The Bill Podcast  that he and executive producer Richard Handford wanted highlight the effect it caused on officers who were victims of tenure, and with the tragic death of Wingett's close friend and colleague Kevin Lloyd a year earlier, Wingett and Handford made the decision to make Jim an alcoholic. The plot culminated in Jim being arrested for a murder that occurred while he was blacked out during a binge, providing the catalyst for his recovery; the plot remained relevant to Jim's character right up to his exit in 2005 to highlight the "one day at a time" methodology used by recovering alcoholics.

Cast changes

Arrivals
 PC Di Worrell (Episode 18-)
 DC Danny Glaze (Episode 30-)
 PC Cass Rickman (Episode 38-)
 PC Dale Smith (Episode 44-)
 PC Nick Klein (Episode 56-)
 DS Claire Stanton (Episode 59-)

Departures
 PC Jamila Blake - Unexplained
 PC Eddie Santini - Jailed for the murder of lover Jess Orton
 DAC Trevor Hicks - Retires
 PC Luke Ashton - Resigns after witnessing a murder-suicide
 PC George Garfield - Resigns after Dave Quinnan and Jenny Delaney's affair
 DC Liz Rawton - Goes from series regular to recurring character after taking role at Hendon in wake of abduction

Episodes
{| class="wikitable plainrowheaders" style="width:100%; margin:auto; background:#FFFFFF;"
|-style="color:#78F"
! style="background-color:#001166;" width="20"|#
! style="background-color:#001166;" width="150"|Title
! style="background-color:#001166;" width="230"|Episode notes
! style="background-color:#001166;" width="140"|Directed by
! style="background-color:#001166;" width="100"|Written by
! style="background-color:#001166;" width="100"|Original air date

|}

References

1999 British television seasons
The Bill series